The 2021 African Weightlifting Championships was held in Nairobi, Kenya from 27 to 29 May 2021.

Medal summary

Men

Women

Medal table 
Ranking by Big (Total result) medals

Ranking by all medals: Big (Total result) and Small (Snatch and Clean & Jerk)

Participating nations

References

External links
 Results

African Weightlifting Championships
African Weightlifting Championships
African Weightlifting Championships
International sports competitions hosted by Kenya
Sport in Nairobi
African Weightlifting Championships
African Weightlifting Championships